Health Management Associates is a defunct Arkansas-based company involved in a blood-management scandal during the 1980s.

HMA scandal
The Health Management Associates Scandal refers to the sale of tainted blood from HMA (a now defunct American company based in Arkansas) to Canadian blood banks.

HMA was contracted by the state of Arkansas to provide health care to prisoners in the state of Arkansas in the early to mid-1980s. This arrangement allowed HMA to collect blood from the prisoners. The blood, some of it proven to be infected with HIV and hepatitis C, was found in the Canadian blood supply. It was not found in American supplies because of a ban on prisoner blood use.

The president of HMA at that time was Leonard Dunn, a close friend of Bill Clinton and Vincent Foster. He chaired Clinton's re-election campaign and was appointed by Clinton to the Arkansas Industrial Development Commission. Foster committed suicide on July 20, 1993. Conspiracy theorists have tried to link his death to HMA and the Whitewater Scandal to prove he was murdered.

The Krever Report

Justice Horace Krever led a Royal Commission (public inquiry) in 1993 which uncovered the Arkansas prison blood scheme, as he reported in 1997. The primary purpose of the report was to work on ways of improving the Canadian blood system to avoid similar problems in the future. Also, the report makes mention of similar problems with prisoner blood collection practices in Florida, Louisiana, and Mississippi, as well as concerns about blood in general from San Francisco.

See also
 Royal Commission of Inquiry on the Blood System in Canada
 Contaminated haemophilia blood products
 Factor 8: The Arkansas Prison Blood Scandal
 Contaminated haemophilia blood products

References

External links
 Tainted Blood from Arkansas 
 Clinton Blood Scandal

Medical controversies in Canada
Contaminated haemophilia blood products
Medical and health organizations based in Arkansas
Medical scandals in the United States